Hungary competed at the 1976 Summer Olympics in Montreal, Quebec, Canada. 178 competitors, 124 men and 54 women, took part in 109 events in 17 sports.

Medalists

Gold
 Miklós Németh — Athletics, Men's Javelin Throw 
 Ildikó Schwarczenberger — Fencing, Women's Foil Individual 
 Zoltán Magyar — Gymnastics, Men's Pommeled Horse 
 Gábor Csapó, Tibor Cservenyák, Tamás Faragó, György Gerendás, György Horkai, György Kenéz, Ferenc Konrád, Endre Molnár, László Sárosi, Attila Sudár, and István Szívós, Jr. — Water Polo, Men's Team Competition

Silver
 Zoltán Sztanity — Canoeing, Men's K1 500m Kayak Singles
 Géza Csapó — Canoeing, Men's K1 1000m Kayak Singles
 Anna Pfeffer and Klára Rajnai — Canoeing, Women's K2 500m Kayak Pairs 
 György Kőszegi — Weightlifting, Men's Flyweight 
 József Balla — Wrestling, Men's Freestyle Super Heavyweight

Bronze
 Zoltán Bakó and István Szabó — Canoeing, Men's K2 1000m Kayak Pairs
 Tamás Wichmann — Canoeing, Men's C1 1000m Canadian Singles
 Tamás Buday and Oszkár Frey — Canoeing, Men's C2 500m Canadian Pairs 
 Tamás Buday and Oszkár Frey — Canoeing, Men's C2 1000m Canadian Pairs 
 Klára Rajnai — Canoeing, Women's K1 500m Kayak Singles 
 Győző Kulcsár — Fencing, Men's Épée Individual
 Ildikó Bóbis, Edit Kovács, Magda Maros, Ildikó Schwarczenberger, and Ildikó Rejtő — Fencing, Women's Foil Team
 Márta Egervári — Gymnastics, Women's Asymmetrical Bars 
 Éva Angyal, Ágota Bujdosó, Klára Horváth, Zsuzsanna Pethő, Katalin Tóth Harsányi, Rozália Toman, Márta Pacsai, Ilona Nagy, Marianna Nagy, Erzsébet Németh, Amália Sterbinszky, Borbála Tóth Harsányi, and Mária Vanya — Handball, Women's Team Competition
 József Tuncsik — Judo, Men's Lightweight (63 kg)
 Tamás Kancsal, Tibor Maracskó, and Svetiszláv Sasics — Modern Pentathlon, Men's Team Competition
 Péter Baczakó — Weightlifting, Men's Light Heavyweight 
 László Réczi — Wrestling, Men's Greco-Roman Featherweight

Athletics

Men's High Jump
 Endre Kelemen
 Qualification — 2.13m (→ did not advance)

 István Major
 Qualification — 2.05m (→ did not advance)

Men's Discus Throw
 Ferenc Tégla
 Qualification — 61.66m
 Final — 60.54m (→ 11th place)

 Janós Farago
 Qualification — 60.06m
 Final — 57.48m (→ 14th place)

Men's 20 km Race Walk
 Imre Stankovics — 1:32:06 (→ 16th place)

Boxing

Men's Light Flyweight (– 48 kg)
 György Gedó
 First Round — Defeated Said Bashiri (IRN), KO-2 
 Second Round — Defeated Serdamba Batsuk (MGL), 5:0 
 Quarterfinals — Lost to Payao Pooltarat (THA), 1:4

Men's Flyweight (– 51 kg)
 Sandor Orbán
 First Round — Lost to Said Ahmed El-Ashry (EGY), 0:5

Canoeing

Cycling

One cyclist represented Hungary in 1976.

Individual pursuit
 Gábor Szűcs — 16th place

Fencing

18 fencers, 13 men and 5 women, represented Hungary in 1976.

Men's foil
 József Komatits
 Lajos Somodi Jr.
 Jenő Kamuti

Men's team foil
 József Komatits, Csaba Fenyvesi, Lajos Somodi Jr., Jenő Kamuti, Sándor Erdős

Men's épée
 Győző Kulcsár
 István Osztrics
 Csaba Fenyvesi

Men's team épée
 Csaba Fenyvesi, Sándor Erdős, István Osztrics, Pál Schmitt, Győző Kulcsár

Men's sabre
 Imre Gedővári
 Tamás Kovács
 Péter Marót

Men's team sabre
 Péter Marót, Tamás Kovács, Imre Gedővári, Ferenc Hammang, Csaba Körmöczi

Women's foil
 Ildikó Schwarczenberger-Tordasi
 Ildikó Farkasinszky-Bóbis
 Ildikó Ságiné Ujlakyné Rejtő

Women's team foil
 Ildikó Schwarczenberger-Tordasi, Ildikó Ságiné Ujlakyné Rejtő, Ildikó Farkasinszky-Bóbis, Magda Maros, Edit Kovács

Gymnastics

Handball

Judo

Modern pentathlon

Three male pentathletes represented Hungary in 1976, winning bronze in the team event.

Individual
 Tamás Kancsal
 Tibor Maracskó
 Szvetiszláv Sasics

Team
 Tamás Kancsal
 Tibor Maracskó
 Szvetiszláv Sasics

Rowing

Sailing

Shooting

Swimming

Volleyball

Women's team competition
Preliminary round (group A)
 Lost to Japan (0-3)
 Defeated Canada (3-1)
 Defeated Peru (3-1)
Semi Finals
 Lost to Soviet Union (0-3)
Bronze Medal Match
 Lost to South Korea (1-3) → Fourth place

Team roster
Zsuzsa Szloboda
Gyöngyi Bardi
Eva Biszku
Zsuzsa Biszku 
Lucia Banhegyi 
Gabriella Fekete 
Agnes Hubai
Judit Schlegl 
Agnes Torma
Katalin Schadek 
Emerencia Kiraly 
Eva Szalay
Head coach: Gabriella Kotsis

Water polo

Weightlifting

Wrestling

References

Nations at the 1976 Summer Olympics
1976 Summer Olympics
Olympics